The New York Americans, colloquially known as the Amerks, were a professional ice hockey team based in New York City from 1925 to 1942. They were the third expansion team in the history of the National Hockey League (NHL) and the second to play in the United States. The team never won the Stanley Cup, but reached the semifinals twice. While it was the first team in New York City, it was eclipsed by the second, the New York Rangers, which arrived in 1926 under the ownership of the Amerks' landlord, Madison Square Garden. The team operated as the Brooklyn Americans during the 1941–42 season before suspending operations in 1942 due to World War II and long-standing financial difficulties. The demise of the club marked the beginning of the NHL's Original Six era from 1942 to 1967, though the Amerks' franchise was not formally canceled until 1946.

The team's overall regular season record was 255–402–127.

Franchise history

Formation

In 1923, Canadian sports promoter Thomas Duggan received options on three NHL franchises for the United States. He sold one to Boston grocery magnate Charles Adams, which became the Boston Bruins in 1924. Duggan then arranged with Tex Rickard to have a team in Madison Square Garden. Rickard agreed, but play was delayed until the new Garden was built in 1925. In April of that year, Duggan and Bill Dwyer, New York City's most-celebrated prohibition bootlegger, were awarded the franchise for New York. Somewhat fortuitously given the shortage of players, the Hamilton Tigers, who had finished first the season before, had been suspended from the league after they struck for higher pay. However, the suspensions were quietly lifted in the off-season. Soon afterward, Dwyer duly bought the collective rights to the Tiger players for $75,000. He gave the players healthy raises—in some cases, double their 1924–25 season's salaries. Just before the season, Dwyer announced the team would be known as the New York Americans. Their original jerseys were covered with stars and stripes, patterned after the American flag. Although he acquired the Tigers' players, Dwyer did not acquire the franchise; it was expelled from the league. As a result, the NHL does not consider the Americans to be a continuation of the Tigers—or for that matter, of the Tigers' predecessors, the Quebec Bulldogs. The Americans entered the league in the 1925–26 season along with the Pittsburgh Pirates. The Americans and Pirates became the second and third American-based teams in the NHL, following Adams' Boston Bruins, who had begun play the previous season.

NHL years

The Americans played their first home game at the Garden, losing 3–1 to the Montreal Canadiens in front of 17,000 people. However, success did not come easily for the Americans. Despite icing essentially the same team that finished first the previous year, they finished fifth overall in their first season with a record of 12–22–4. However, they were a success at the box office; so much so that the following season Garden management landed a team of its own, the New York Rangers. A clause in the Amerks' lease with the Garden required them to support any bid for the Garden to acquire an NHL franchise. The Garden had promised Dwyer that it would never exercise that option, and that the Amerks would be the only team in the arena. However, when the Garden opted to seek its own team after all, the Amerks had little choice but to agree. 

The 1926–27 season saw the Americans continue to struggle, finishing 17–25–2. Part of the problem was that they were placed in the Canadian Division in defiance of all geographic reality, resulting in a larger number of train trips to Montreal, Toronto and Ottawa. Meanwhile, the Rangers won the American Division title. The next season saw the Americans fall even further by finishing last in their division (ninth overall) with a record of 11–27–6, while the Rangers captured the Stanley Cup in only their second year of existence. The Americans were thus doomed to a long history as New York City's second team.

The 1928–29 NHL season saw the Amerks sign star goaltender Roy Worters from the Pittsburgh Pirates. He led the team to a 19–13–12 record in that season, good enough for second in the Canadian Division (fourth overall). Worters had a 1.21 goals against average (GAA), becoming the first goaltender to win the Hart Trophy as the most valuable player in the league. Standing on Worters' shoulders, the Americans made the playoffs for the first time, but were unable to beat the Rangers in a total goals series. The Rangers had extreme difficulty scoring against Worters, but the futile Americans were equally unable to score against the Rangers. The Rangers ended up winning the series in the second game, 1–0 in overtime.

The following season saw the Americans plunge to fifth place in the division (ninth overall) with a 14–25–5 record. Worters followed up his stellar 1928–29 season with an atrocious 3.75 goals against average. Worters rebounded the next season, with a 1.68 goals against average. That was good enough to give the Americans a winning record. However, they missed out on a playoff berth since the Montreal Maroons had two more wins, which was the NHL's first tiebreaker for playoff seeding.

The 1931–32 season saw some developments that changed the way the hockey was played. In a game against the Bruins, the Americans iced the puck 61 times. At that time, there was no rule against icing. Adams was so angry that he pressed, to no avail, for the NHL to make a rule against icing, so the next time the two teams met, the Bruins iced the puck 87 times in a scoreless game. It was not until a few years later that the NHL made a rule prohibiting icing, but those two games were the catalyst for change.

The Americans' lackluster on-ice performance was not the only problem for the franchise. With the end of Prohibition, Dwyer was finding it difficult to make ends meet. After the 1933–34 NHL season, having missed the playoffs for the fifth straight year, the Americans attempted a merger with the equally strapped Senators, only to be turned down by the NHL Board of Governors. During the 1935–36 season, Dwyer decided to sell the team. As fortunes had it, the Americans made the playoffs for the first time in six years under player-coach Red Dutton, but bowed out in the second round against the Maple Leafs. Even with this rebound, no buyers came forward, prompting Dwyer to abandon the team. The league announced a takeover of the team for the next season. Dwyer sued the NHL, saying it had no authority to seize his team. A settlement was reached whereby Dwyer could resume control provided he could pay off his debts by the end of the season. However, Dwyer could not do so, and the NHL took full control of the franchise. Despite the presence of Dutton, who had retired as a player to become coach and general manager, the team fared no better under the league's operation than before, finishing last with a record of 15–29–4. The only bright spot was Sweeney Schriner, who led the league in scoring that year.

The league asked Dutton to become operating head of the franchise for the 1937–38 season. The Americans signed veterans Ching Johnson and Hap Day and acquired goalie Earl Robertson. These new acquisitions greatly helped the team as they finished the season with a 19–18–11 record and made the playoffs. In the playoffs, they beat the Rangers in three games, but lost to the Chicago Black Hawks in three.

The Americans made the playoffs again in 1938–39 and 1939–40 seasons, but were bounced in the first round each time. Canada entered World War II in September 1939, and some of the team's Canadian players left for military service. An even larger number of players entered the military in 1940–41. With a decimated roster, the Americans missed the playoffs with a record of 8–29–11, the worst in franchise history. While the league's other teams were similarly hard-hit, Dutton was still bogged down by lingering debt from the Dwyer era. This debt, combined with the depletion of talent and wartime travel restrictions, forced Dutton to sell off his best players for cash. The Amerks were clearly living on borrowed time; it was only a matter of when, not if, they would fold.

"Brooklyn" Americans
At wit's end, Dutton changed the team's name for the 1941–42 NHL season to the Brooklyn Americans. He intended to move the team to Brooklyn, but there was no arena in that borough suitable enough even for temporary use. As result, they continued to play their home games in Manhattan at Madison Square Garden while practicing in Brooklyn. They barely survived the season, finishing dead last for the second year in a row with a record of 16–29–3. After the season, the Amerks suspended operations for the war's duration. In 1945, a group emerged willing to build a new arena in Brooklyn. However, in 1946, the NHL reneged on previous promises to reinstate the Amerks and canceled the franchise. Although Dutton had every intention of returning the Amerks to the ice after World War II, NHL records list the Amerks as having "retired" from the league in 1942.

Legacy
The NHL did not expand beyond its remaining six teams until the 1967–68 season. Dutton blamed the owners of Madison Square Garden (who also owned the Rangers) for pressuring the NHL to not reinstate the Americans. Dutton was so bitter that he purportedly swore the Rangers would never win a Stanley Cup again in his lifetime. This "curse" became reality; the Rangers did not win another Cup until 1994, seven years after his death.

The last active New York Americans player was Pat Egan, who retired in 1951 but played minor ice hockey until 1959 with Victoria Cougars of the Western Hockey League. Egan returned to ice hockey in 1966 playing for the Jacksonville Rockets of the Eastern Hockey League playing only 20 games as player/head coach. The last active Brooklyn Americans player was Ken Mosdell, who retired in 1959.

The 1926–27 Americans team was the first team in professional sports history to have their surnames on the back of their uniform sweaters, along with numbers.

The New York metropolitan area did not have a second NHL team again until the establishment of the New York Islanders in nearby Uniondale, on Long Island, for the 1972–73 season. While the Americans attempted to relocate to Brooklyn in their final years, the Islanders did so, playing at the Barclays Center from 2015 to 2020, although unlike the Americans they continued to be known as the New York Islanders.

Season-by-season record
Note: GP = Games played, W = Wins, L = Losses, T = Ties, Pts = Points, GF = Goals for, GA = Goals against, PIM = Penalties in minutes

Team personnel

Hall of Famers
Billy Burch
Charlie Conacher
Lionel Conacher
Red Dutton
Busher Jackson
Ching Johnson
Harry Oliver
Chuck Rayner
Sweeney Schriner
Eddie Shore
Bullet Joe Simpson
Hooley Smith
Nels Stewart
Roy Worters

Team captains
Billy Burch, 1925–1932
Red Dutton, 1932–1936
Sweeney Schriner, 1936–1939
Charlie Conacher, 1939–1941
Tommy Anderson, 1941–1942

Coaches

Head coaches for the New York Americans:
 Tommy Gorman, 1925–1926, 1928–1929
 Newsy Lalonde, 1926–1927
 Shorty Green, 1927–1928
 Lionel Conacher, 1929–1930
 Eddie Gerard, 1930–1932
 Bullet Joe Simpson, 1932–1935
 Rosie Helmer, 1935–1936
 Red Dutton, 1935–1940
 Art Chapman, 1940–1942

Broadcasters
The Americans' radio situation mirrored that of the New York Rangers: same stations, same broadcasters, same announcers; home games only, joined-in-progress. Jack Filman was the principal radio announcer for the Americans on and off until their demise.

A few Americans and Rangers games were on experimental TV stations in 1940-41 and 1941-42; then public television broadcasting closed down until 1945-46.

See also

List of New York Americans players
List of NHL seasons
List of NHL players
List of defunct NHL teams
Curse of 1940

References
Notes

Sources

Further reading

External links

 New York Americans

 
Americans
1925 establishments in New York (state)
1946 disestablishments in New York (state)
Defunct ice hockey teams in the United States
Defunct National Hockey League teams
Defunct sports teams in New York City
Ice hockey clubs established in 1925
Ice hockey teams in the New York metropolitan area
Sports clubs disestablished in 1946